Arator was a sixth-century Christian poet from Liguria in northwestern Italy. His best known work, De Actibus Apostolorum, is a verse history of the Apostles.

Biography
Arator was probably of Ligurian origin. An orphan, he studied at Milan under the patronage of the Bishop Laurentius and of Magnus Felix Ennodius, then went to Ravenna by the advice of Parthenius, nephew of Ennodius. He took up the career of a lawyer.

Treated with distinction by Theodoric on account of his oration in behalf of the Dalmatians, and protected by Cassiodorus, he entered the service of the Gothic court, but resigned at the time of the struggle with Byzantium (about 536). Pope Vigilius made him Subdeacon of the Roman Church. It was there that he wrote in hexameters two books De Actibus Apostolorum, about 544. He follows the story of the Acts of the Apostles; the first book, dedicated to St. Peter, concludes with Chapter XII; the second, dedicated to St. Paul, with the martyrdom of the two Apostles. Many important events are omitted, others only alluded to.

Arator himself declared that his aim was to give the mystical and moral meaning of the book. Accordingly, he often gives strange interpretations of numbers and names. He endeavours to praise St. Peter at the expense of St. Paul and the other Apostles.

His style and versification are fairly correct, and he cleverly evades the entanglements of symbolism. The poem was very successful. Vigilius had the author read it in public at the church of San Pietro in Vincoli in Rome. The reading lasted four days, as the poet had to repeat many passages by request of his audience.

His works remained popular during the Middle Ages, when they became classics. We have also two addresses in distichs written by Arator to the Abbot Florianus and to Vigilius, as well as a letter to Parthenius. The latter two pieces contain biographical details.

The date of the poet's death is unknown.

Citations

General and cited source 
 
 Tino Licht: Aratoris fortuna, in: Quaerite faciem eius semper, Hamburg 2008, pp. 163–179.
 See also Roger P. H. Green, Latin Epics of the New Testament: Juvencus, Sedulius, Arator, Oxford UP, 2008,  (reviewed by Teresa Morgan in the article "Poets for Jesus", Times Literary Supplement, 4 April 2008, p. 31).

External links
 Arator, his "Historia Apostolica" and its "tituli" and "capitula", with bibliography of editions and translations.

6th-century Christians
6th-century Italian writers
6th-century Latin writers
6th-century poets
Christian poets
Ancient Roman poets